Nathan Matthews Jr. (March 28, 1854 – December 11, 1927) was an American politician from Massachusetts who served as Mayor of Boston from 1891 to 1894.

Biography
Born in Boston, Massachusetts on March 28, 1854, son of Nathan and Albertine (Bunker) Matthews. Nathan Matthews Jr. was a lawyer-turned-politician who served as the mayor of Boston from 1891 to 1894.  He was a member of the Democratic Party. Matthews earned an A.B. from Harvard College in 1875 and a LL.B. from Harvard Law School in 1880. He married Ellen Bacon, daughter of Col. Lucius Manlius Sargent, Jr. on April 5, 1883. They had two children, Ellen Natalie Matthews and Sullivan Amory Matthews.

Mayoralty
On December 15, 1891, Mathews was reelected Mayor over Horace G. Allen by 15,182 votes.

Death and burial
Matthews died at Massachusetts General Hospital on December 11, 1927, from a pulmonary embolism.  He is interred at Mount Auburn Cemetery, Cambridge, Massachusetts.

See also
 Timeline of Boston, 1890s

References
 Mayors of Boston: An Illustrated Epitome of who the Mayors Have Been and What they Have Done, Boston, MA: State Street Trust Company, Page 39–41, (1914).
Marquis, Albert Nelson.: Who's Who in New England: A Biographical Dictionary of Leading Men and Women of the State of Maine, New Hampshire, Vermont, Massachusetts, Rhode Island and Connecticut, (1915), page 731.

Further reading

 Matthews, Nathan. The City Government of Boston : a Valedictory Address to the Members of the City Council, January 5, 1895. Rockwell and Churchill, 1895.

External links
 Political Graveyard information on Nathan Matthews Jr. (1854–1927)

1854 births
1927 deaths
Harvard Law School alumni
Leipzig University alumni
Mayors of Boston
Deaths from pulmonary embolism